Novak Djokovic was the defending champion, but lost in the semifinals to Stefanos Tsitsipas.

Rafael Nadal won his record fifth title beating debutante Tsitsipas in the final.

Seeds

Draw

Draw

Play-offs

References

External links
Official website

World Tennis Championship
2019 in Emirati tennis
World Tennis Championship
Mubadala World Tennis Championship - Men